Cathy Muller (born 21 November 1962) is a French former racing driver. She is the older sister of racing driver Yvan Muller and the mother of racing driver Yann Ehrlacher.

Racing career

Junior formulae
Muller started racing in the Renault 5 Turbo series in the early 1980s. From there she graduated into the French Formula Renault Turbo Championship finishing fifth driving a Martini Mk36. She then moved to European Formula 3 driving for David Price Racing in 1983 and Pavesi Racing in 1984. In 1985 she raced in the British Formula Three Championship again driving for David Price Racing finishing ninth. After a few seasons in Formula 3000 she returned to the French Formula Three Championship finishing tenth.

Formula 3000 and Indy Lights
In 1986 she raced in Formula 3000 for the first time, qualifying for four events. She returned in 1988 failing to qualify for the season opening race. In 1990 she moved to the American Indy Lights Championship after racing in one race in 1989 finishing sixteenth for the season.

Sportscars
She made her debut in the World Sportscar Championship at the 1984 Sandown 1000 driving for Gebhardt Motorsport. In 1987 she finished seventh in the 1000 km of Nürburgring and raced in the 1991 24 Hours of Le Mans where she did not finish.

In 1993 and 1994 she raced in the Peugeot 905 Spider Cup finishing fifth and second in the championship respectively.

Racing record

Complete International Formula 3000 results
(key) (Races in bold indicate pole position; races in italics indicate fastest lap.)

Complete Indy Lights results

Complete 24 Hours of Le Mans results

References

External links
 Driver Database Profile
 Racing Reference US Stats

1962 births
Living people
French racing drivers
International Formula 3000 drivers
24 Hours of Le Mans drivers
British Formula Three Championship drivers
FIA European Formula 3 Championship drivers
World Sportscar Championship drivers
French female racing drivers
Sportspeople from Haut-Rhin
David Price Racing drivers
Oreca drivers